Arthur Minasyan may refer to:

 Arthur Minasyan (footballer, born 1977), Armenian footballer
 Arthur Minasyan (footballer, born 1978), Armenian footballer

See also
 Minasyan
 Artur Minosyan (born 1989), Russian footballer